Rumpelstiltskin is a 1955 fantasy film directed by Herbert B. Fredersdorf. It stars Werner Krüger as the title character. The film was released in the United States by K. Gordon Murray in 1965 and re-released by Paramount Pictures in 1974.

Plot 
The miller's daughter Marie is demanded to spin straw into gold for the king.  She has given up all hope until suddenly a little man appears. He wants to help Marie, but only under a cruel condition ...

Based on the fairy tale by the Brothers Grimm.

Cast 
 Werner Krüger as Rumpelstilzchen
 Liane Croon as the Miller's daughter Marie
 Wilhelm Grothe as the Miller Mehlsack
 Hermann Hartmann as the Coachman
 Günter Hertel as the King's son Max
 F. W. Schröder-Schrom as the King
 Harry Wüstenhagen as the Treasurer
 Helmut Ziegner as the Prime Minister

References

External links 
 

1955 films
1950s fantasy films
German fantasy films
German children's films
West German films
1950s German-language films
Films based on Rumpelstiltskin
Films based on fairy tales
1950s German films